Goodrich is an English toponymic surname, which indicates someone from Goodrich in Herefordshire. The name is a modern form of the Anglo-Saxon given name Godric which is made of the Old Norse word guðini or god combined with the Saxon word ric "ruler", ruler of god. Notable people with the surname include:

Aaron Goodrich (1807–1887), first Chief Justice of Minnesota Territorial Supreme Court
Annie Warburton Goodrich (1866–1954), American nurse
Arthur Goodrich (1878-1941), American playwright
Benjamin Franklin Goodrich (1841–1888), founder of the Goodrich Corporation
Caspar Goodrich (died 1907), American sailor, son of the admiral
Caspar F. Goodrich (1847–1925), American admiral
Chauncey Goodrich (1759–1815), senator from Connecticut
Chauncey Allen Goodrich (1790–1860), American clergyman, educator and lexicographer
Derek Goodrich (1927-2021), English Anglican priest in Guyana
Edwin Goodrich American general awarded Medal of Honor in the US Civil War
Edwin Stephen Goodrich (1868–1946), English zoologist
Elizur Goodrich (1761–1849), lawyer and politician from Connecticut
Frances Goodrich (1890–1984), American dramatist and screenwriter
Frederick E. Goodrich
Gail Goodrich (born 1943), basketball player
Herbert Funk Goodrich, (1889–1962), judge on the United States Court of Appeals for the Third Circuit
Henry Edwin Goodrich, British Labour politician
James P. Goodrich (1864–1940), Governor of Indiana
John Goodrich (Loyalist) (1722-1785), Loyalist privateer during the American Revolution
John Z. Goodrich, lieutenant governor of Massachusetts
Joseph Goodrich (1800-1867),  American pioneer and politician
L. Carrington Goodrich (1894–1986), American Sinologist
Lloyd Goodrich (1897–1987), American art historian
Mario Goodrich (born 2000), American football player
Michael T. Goodrich, American mathematician and computer scientist
Patricia A. Goodrich, American politician
Samuel Griswold Goodrich (1793–1860), American author, used the pseudonym Peter Parley
Simon Goodrich (1773–1847), engineer to the British Navy Board
Thomas Goodrich (died 1554), English ecclesiastic